The Core Issues Trust is a British Christian fundamentalist organisation that provides conversion therapy for LGBT people.

Purpose 
The Trust offers psycho-therapeutic therapy to those who experience unwanted homosexual behaviour and feelings. Core Issues Trust states it believes human sexuality in both men and women is a choice, and that sexual preferences can change. The Trust says it does not consider homosexuality a native human behaviour, but rather a relational or sexual damage that causes deviancy that may be cured. The group's leader, Dr. Mike Davidson, describes himself as ex-gay.

Activities 
In June 2011, the Core Issues Trust organized a one-day event in a church in Belfast entitled "Interrogating the Pejoratives: Considering Therapeutic Approaches and Contexts for those Conflicted in Sexual Identity". Some of the topics on the agenda were "How parents can help their children avoid homosexuality" and "A Christian and psychological perspective on overcoming obstacles to freedom from homosexuality". Gay rights groups protested against the Church of Ireland that the event was being held in one of the country's churches.

In April 2012, the organization received media coverage following a public campaign, which included advertisements on London buses claiming that therapy could change sexual orientation, and including the message Not gay! Ex-gay, post-gay and proud. Get over it!. Although the campaign was passed by the Committee of Advertising Practice, it was subsequently banned by then- London Mayor Boris Johnson. The Trust lost an appeal at the Court of Appeal against the ban, although it secured a review of the Mayor's actions. The Trust lodged a further case in the High Court in January 2014, alleging that Johnson had unlawfully used his position to ban the ad. The Court ruled against the Trust, stating that the decision had been made by the Transport for London Board.

In 2018, the Trust released the documentary Voices of the Silenced which follows 15 gay and lesbian people going through conversion therapy. The documentary was criticized by LGBT rights charity Stonewall, who stated "LGBT people aren't ill. Being gay, lesbian, bi or trans is not something that should be 'cured' or changed." Humanists UK stated it contained "outdated religious views about sin and sexuality".

In 2019, the Core Issues Trust produced and promoted the film Once Gay: Matthew and Friends about the X Factor Malta contestant Matthew Grech who announced his renunciation of homosexuality on television. Mike Davidson argued that individuals have the right to "leave unwanted homosexual practices" if they  want to. The film sparked protest. Afterwards, Matthew Grech stated in an interview that he still identified as gay.

See also 
Homosexuality and Christianity
Conversion therapy

References

External links 
 Official website

Christian organisations based in the United Kingdom
Christian political organizations
Organizations in the ex-gay movement
Lobbying organisations in the United Kingdom